Działki Suskowolskie  is a village in the administrative district of Gmina Pionki, within Radom County, Masovian Voivodeship, in eastern Poland.

References

Villages in Radom County